Desert Rider is a 1923 American silent Western film directed by Robert N. Bradbury and starring Jack Hoxie, Frank Rice and Evelyn Nelson.

Cast
 Jack Hoxie as Jack Sutherland
 Frank Rice as Toby Jones
 Evelyn Nelson as Carolyn Grey
 Claude Payton as Rufe Kinkaid
 Thomas G. Lingham as Dan Baird 
 Walter Wilkinson as Mickey Baird

References

External links
 

1923 films
1923 Western (genre) films
1920s English-language films
American black-and-white films
Films directed by Robert N. Bradbury
Silent American Western (genre) films
1920s American films